Carl Laemmle (born Karl Lämmle; January 17, 1867 – September 24, 1939) was a film producer and the co-founder and, until 1934, owner of Universal Pictures. He produced or worked on over 400 films.

Regarded as one of the most important of the early film pioneers, Laemmle was born in what is now Germany. He immigrated to the United States in 1884 and worked in Chicago for 20 years before he began buying nickelodeons, eventually expanding into a film distribution service, the Laemmle Film Service, then into production as Independent Moving Pictures Company (IMP), later renamed Universal Film Manufacturing Company, and later still renamed Universal Pictures Company.

Early life and education
Karl Lämmle was born in 1867 to Julius Baruch Lämmle and Rebekka Lämmle, a Jewish couple in the Radstrasse, a street in the Jewish quarter of Laupheim, in the Kingdom of Württemberg. His father was a cattle merchant, also involved in land transactions. The family struggled financially and lived in poverty: Of his eleven siblings only 3 reached adulthood. He was one of the youngest children, and close to his mother, who enrolled him in a Jewish school. When he was 13, she arranged a three-year apprenticeship for him in Ichenhausen, a nearby village, where he learned accounting and sales, and worked to support his family.

Career
After his mother had died in 1883, Laemmle decided to emigrate to the US for a better life, also following his thirteen-year-older brother Joseph. For his 17th birthday, his father had given him the tickets for an Atlantic crossing on the steamboat S.S. Neckar plus fifty dollars. He left Bremerhaven on January 28, 1884 and arrived in New York on February 14, 1884. He settled in Chicago. Here he lived for about twenty years as a bookkeeper and office manager. In 1889, he became a naturalized American citizen. Laemmle worked a variety of jobs, but by 1894 he was the bookkeeper of the Continental Clothing Company in Oshkosh, Wisconsin, where he introduced a bolder advertising style.

In 1906, at the age of 39, Laemmle quit his job. He initially wanted to open a network of cheap retail stores, but changed his mind after entering a nickelodeon. He started one of the first motion picture theaters in Chicago, The White Front on Milwaukee Avenue, and quickly branched out into film exchange services. He challenged Thomas Edison's monopoly on moving pictures, the Motion Picture Patents Company, under the Sherman Anti-Trust Act of 1890. As part of his offensive against Edison's company, Laemmle began advertising individual "stars," such as Mary Pickford and Florence Lawrence, thus increasing their individual earning power, and thus their willingness to side with the "Independents."

After moving to New York, Carl Laemmle became involved in producing movies, forming Independent Moving Pictures (IMP); the city was the site of many new movie-related businesses. On April 30, 1912, in New York, Laemmle brought together Pat Powers of Powers Motion Picture Company, Mark Dintenfass of Champion Film Company, William Swanson of Rex Motion Picture Company, David Horsley of Nestor Film Company, as well as Charles Baumann and Adam Kessel of the New York Motion Picture Company, to merge their companies with IMP as the "Universal Film Manufacturing Company", with Laemmle assuming the role of president. They founded the Company with studios in Fort Lee, New Jersey, where at the beginning of the 20th century many early film studios in America's first motion picture industry were based. 

On March 15, 1915, Laemmle opened the world's largest motion picture production facility, Universal Studios Hollywood, on a 230-acre (0.9-km2) converted farm in the San Fernando Valley, just over the Cahuenga Pass from Hollywood. 

Universal maintained two East Coast offices: The first was located at 1600 Broadway, New York City. This building, initially known as the Studebaker Building, was razed around 2004 or 2005. The second location to house Universal's executive offices was at 730 Fifth Avenue, New York City. Many years later, 445 Park Avenue was the location of Universal's executive offices. In 1916, Laemmle sponsored the $3,000 three-foot-tall solid silver Universal Trophy for the winner of the annual Universal race at the Uniontown Speedway board track in southwestern Pennsylvania. Universal filmed each race from 1916 to 1922.

In 1936, Laemmle and his son were removed from the company he founded by a hostile takeover. He briefly resumed distribution with a partner, Michael Mindlin, specializing in foreign films as CL Imports, in the mid-1930s, but for the most part remained in secluded retirement until his death.

Personal life

In 1898, Laemmle married Recha Stern, the niece of Sam Stern, his employer at Continental Clothing Company. Recha gave birth to Rosabelle in 1903 and Julius Laemmle (Carl Laemmle Jr.) in 1908. Rosabelle Laemmle Bergerman was later married to Stanley Bergerman.

After moving to California, Laemmle purchased as a residence for his family the former home of film pioneer Thomas Ince on Benedict Canyon Drive, Beverly Hills, a house which was razed in the early 1940s. Laemmle also maintained a large apartment for himself and his two children at 465 West End Avenue, New York City, one block off Riverside Drive near the Hudson River.

Recha Stern Laemmle contracted the Spanish flu and died from pneumonia on January 13, 1919 at age 43.

Asked how to pronounce his surname, he told The Literary Digest, "The name means little lamb, and is pronounced as if it were spelled 'lem-lee'."

His niece, Rebekah Isabelle Laemmle, known professionally as Carla Laemmle, appeared in several films until her retirement from acting at the end of the 1930s. His great-nephew, Michael Laemmle, is a well-known resident of Darwin, California, and was featured in the 2011 documentary Darwin: No Services Ahead. His great-grandniece, Antonia Carlotta, talks about him at length in Universally Me, her web series about the history of Universal Studios.

Poet Ogden Nash observed the following about Laemmle's habit of giving his son and nephews top executive positions in his studios:

Family members involved in the film industry included Isadore Bernstein, Joseph Stern, and Abe Stern, all brothers-in-law, and Ernst Laemmle, Edward Laemmle, and Max and Kurt Laemmle.

Death
Laemmle died from cardiovascular disease on September 24, 1939 in Beverly Hills, California, at the age of 72. Laemmle was entombed in the Chapel Mausoleum at Home of Peace Cemetery.

Awards and honors
 Oscar, 1930 for All Quiet on the Western Front.

Legacy
Laemmle, although having made hundreds of films in his active years as a producer (1909–1934), is remembered for The Hunchback of Notre Dame (1923), The Phantom of The Opera (1925), both with Lon Chaney Sr. in the title role, and The Man Who Laughs (1928) and most of the early sound horror films, such as Dracula (1931) and Frankenstein (1931), with his son, Carl Jr.

Laemmle remained connected to his home town of Laupheim throughout his life, providing financial support to it. In the 1930s he sponsored hundreds of Jews from Laupheim and Württemberg to emigrate from Nazi Germany to the United States, paying both emigration and immigration fees, thus saving them from the Holocaust. To ensure and facilitate their immigration, Laemmle contacted American authorities, members of the House of Representatives and Secretary of State Cordell Hull.

Representation in other media
as a main character in the novel The Dream Merchants (1949) by Harold Robbins, a former Universal Studios employee.
as a historical character in the TV series The Adventures of Young Indiana Jones (1992).
as a main character in the novel Sweet Memories (2012), David Menefee.

See also
History of the Jews in Laupheim
Laemmle Theatres

References

Further reading

External links

  — Biography sponsored by the Transatlantic Program of the Government of the Federal Republic of Germany
Official Laemmle family website
Universal Studios Archives & Collections
The Jewish Past of Laupheim

Carl Laemmle at Virtual History
 A 9 minute video produced by Universal City Studios from 2013

1867 births
1939 deaths
People from Laupheim
Businesspeople from Los Angeles
People from Beverly Hills, California
American film producers
American film studio executives
American film production company founders
American people of German-Jewish descent
Film exhibitors
Film producers from California
German emigrants to the United States
NBCUniversal people
Universal Pictures
Württemberger emigrants to the United States
Burials at Home of Peace Cemetery
19th-century German Jews
20th-century American Jews